Caesar Colclough (1696–1766) was a Member of Parliament for Wexford County (Parliament of Ireland constituency).

References

1696 births
1766 deaths
Members of the Parliament of Ireland (pre-1801) for County Wexford constituencies
Irish MPs 1715–1727